Roger A. Greene (September 26, 1887 – August 29, 1960) was an American college football player and coach and hospital administrator. He served as the head coach at Bates College from 1913 to 1915, Colby College in 1916 and 1923, and Bowdoin College from 1919 to 1920.

Greene served as a combat officer with the 28th Infantry Division of the United States Army during World War I, reaching the rank of major. He was the superintendent of Pottsville Hospital in Pottsville, Pennsylvania for 18 years before joining the Pennsylvania Department of Health in 1948. Greene died on August 29, 1960, at Veterans' Hospital in Lebanon, Pennsylvania.

References

External links
 

1887 births
1960 deaths
American hospital administrators
Bates Bobcats football coaches
Bowdoin Polar Bears football coaches
Colby Mules football coaches
Marietta Pioneers football players
Penn Quakers football players
United States Army officers
United States Army personnel of World War I
University of Pennsylvania Law School alumni
People from Hoosick Falls, New York
Coaches of American football from New York (state)
Players of American football from New York (state)
Military personnel from New York (state)